Shidu Town is a town in Fangshan District in far southwestern Beijing, around  from the border with Hebei. Shidu, literally the "Tenth Crossing", is located in the valley of the meandering Juma River and so named because accessing the town is said to require crossing the river ten times. Shidu is known for the surrounding karst landscape, the largest in northern China, that is created by the Juma River cutting through the Taihang Mountain. As of 2020, it had a total population of 9,132.

The Beijing–Yuanping Railway has a station in Shidu.

History

Administrative divisions 

In 2020, Shidu Town was made up of 21 villages, all of which are listed down below:

Gallery

See also
List of township-level divisions of Beijing

References

External links
 Official website

Towns in Beijing
Fangshan District